Mandraki is the capital of Nisyros in Greece and is the largest settlement on the island. It is also the harbour of the island and contains many of the island's facilities of tourism such as hotels and apartments. The population is around 682.

Attractions 
There are many beaches as well as many places to eat and drink. The castle, built in 1315, overlooks the settlement.

References

Populated places in Kos (regional unit)